The North Sea Magical Realists are a collective of artists resident on the North Sea coast whose art is loosely influenced by the aesthetics of Magical Realism. Its members include the artists Peter Rodulfo (b. 1958), Mark Burrell (b. 1957) and Rinat Baibekov (b. 1962).

Aware of each other's work for a number of years, Burrell and Rudolfo first met in New York USA, when exhibiting at the New York Expo of 1998.

In 2016 Burrell and Rodulfo elected Thomas Browne as honorary 'Grand-father' of the movement, and simultaneously painted items from Browne's Musaeum Clausum in its section entitled Rarities in Pictures); Rodulfo painted item number 3 in the medium of oils on canvas (157 x 143 cm) with a title of Dr. Browne goes Submarining; Burrell painted item 12 in the medium of alkyd resins on board (50 x 49 cm) with a title of Silent Presence.

In November 2017 the North Sea Magical Realists held their first show at the Tripp Gallery, Amwell Street, London. Rodulfo and Burrell exhibited paintings, sculptures and etchings. The exhibition included assemblages by senior group member Guy Richardson (b.1932) whose art-work was an early influence upon both artists.

On August 1, 2019 the artist Rinat Baibekov joined the movement officially. He too plans to artistically realise an item from Thomas Browne's Musaeum Clausum, sometime in 2020.

References

Art movements